William Peters Robinson Jr. (October 14, 1942 – December 18, 2006) was an American lawyer and politician who served as a member of the Virginia House of Delegates. He was first elected in 1981, in a special election to succeed his father, William P. Robinson Sr.

References

External links
 

1942 births
2006 deaths
Politicians from Norfolk, Virginia
African-American state legislators in Virginia
Democratic Party members of the Virginia House of Delegates
20th-century African-American people
21st-century African-American people
Morehouse College alumni
Harvard Law School alumni